Pokharel or Pokhrel is a surname (family name) Brahman, khatri Cast group in Nepal.

Notable people with Pokharel/Pokhrel surname
 Aastha Pokharel, Nepali model
 Bidhyanath Pokhrel, Nepali poet and politician
 Dibesh Pokharel, Nepali pop singer
 Giriraj Mani Pokharel, Nepali politician
 Prasunna Pokharel, ASA, CPA Australia 
 Ishwor Pokhrel, Nepali Politician
 Laxmi Prasad Pokhrel, Nepali Politician
 Ram Chandra Pokhrel, Nepali Politician
 Shankar Pokhrel (born 1964), Nepali Politician
 Sugam Pokharel, Nepali pop singer
 Suman Pokhrel, Nepali poet, lyricist, translator, playwright
 Sunil Pokharel, Nepali theater director
 Cool Pokhrel, Nepali pop singer
 Susil Pokharel, Software Engineer

Surnames of Nepalese origin
Khas surnames